The North 26 is a boat designed by Julian D Everitt in 1982, Cowes UK, designer of the very successful E boat. Big brother to the E-boat, intended for Yacht racing Inshore and in Junior Offshore Group races to rate under Channel now IRC measurement rule. Examples race the English Channel and have a wide flat sole plate that enables them to sit the mud in English ports with the keel retracted. This feature also enables safe beach sitting whilst cruising and use as a Trailer yacht.

Specifications

I = 29.3 ft  (8.33 m)

J = 8.9 ft  (2.71 m)

P = 33.3 ft  (10.15 m)

E = 11.9 ft  (3.63 m)

Sailing details
Handicaps:
 PHRF = ,
  Portsmouth = ,
  IRC  = about 0.934 (1999),

Class-based handicaps:
CBH (Aust.) = 0.7280 prov. (2000) aluminium cruising,
   Other = ,

Sailing characteristics:
A long waterline boat, easily driven, giving an exhilarating performance while providing comfortable accommodation and safe cruising.

Notable performances: First in the UK 'Round the Island' race non-IOR against 700 yachts. First in Tomatin Triohy as scratch boat giving J 24's nearly 2 minutes an hour handicap advantage.

Accommodation
With a wide beam and a long waterline length equal to that of a ½ tonne yacht the North 26 is comparitably a big volume boat for its length. But is definitely not a ‘floating caravan’ as its performance attests.

The standard layout has two separate cabins plus a separate toilet compartment. The forward cabin contains a full-length V-berth. The main salon has a full-length settee on the starboard side with deep lockers above, below the deck. A quarter berth extends beneath the cockpit on the same side. On the port side is the galley with built-in two-burner spirit stove, a sink and a deep icebox beside the companionway. A folding table can be hinged from the centre board case with a short settee on the port side. An alternative layout would allow for two full-length settees and two quarter berths with the galley above the port side and the use of a portable icebox.

This boat can cruise comfortably with four adults and accommodate 5 or 6 people when need be, say after a race.

Number of crew to race  = 4 or 5, Berths = 5 or 6, Galley =provision for 2 burner stove and sink, portable icebox. Water bladder. Head = portable in separate compartment, Navigation =in salon, Maximum headroom = 5.5 ft, 1.75 m, to standard plan. But 5 ft 11 in (1.88 m) in versions where 5 inches (125 mm) added to the hull freeboard, allows full standing headroom for most people.

Special features
Outboard motor housed in locker with bomb-bay doors at companionway. Doors close up when sailing. Hydraulic operated keel lifting. Keel can be bolted down when racing.

The halyards and sheets lead back to the companionway for central control including mainsail furling, two winches located on the cabin top and two on the side decks handle all tasks. The mast design chosen avoids the need for running backstays, as these are definitely a hindrance and safety problem when cruising short handed.

A deep anchor locker is provided in the bow, ample room for an electric winch. When the outboard is lowered in its bridge-deck well, the propeller is on the centreline of the boat and well forwards of the stern, so that even in rough conditions the prop will not come out of the water, a problem with stern-mounted outboards. When not in use the outboard is out of the way and protected without the need for heavy lifting and removal each trip.

Towable with large 4 WD of about 4 litres, depending on local transport regulations.

Construction
Country of origin, UK

Hull material, design for Ply, Aluminium or Fibreglass. Multichine for ease of amateur construction. The boat is built inverted for ease of access, using fabricated ply or aluminium frames. To minimise ply wastage and enable quick fit out the bulkheads form part of the furniture. There is no need for full size patterns as each frame is fully dimensioned on the drawings. West system epoxy impregnation is used on the ply boats for strength and durability. In aluminium either tubular or RHS stringers are used as weld backing for 3 mm plates. A 6 mm plate in aluminium or 18mm in ply is used for the sole plate which ensures strength for sitting the beach.

Manufacturer, Owner built or professional boat builder

Plans availability, Yes; Cowes UK, Boden Boat Plans Australia,

References
 Cruising Helmsman magazine Feb. 1986 pages 33
 Club Sailing Australia magazine 'The North 26" page 16, 1986
 The North 26 International One Design boat plans. Julian D Everitt High St Cowes.

Keelboats
1980s sailboat type designs